{{DISPLAYTITLE:C6442H9966N1706O2018S40}}
The molecular formula C6442H9966N1706O2018S40 (molar mass: 144.88 kg/mol) may refer to:

 Carlumab
 Crenezumab